Martha Stewart Living Radio was a 24-hour satellite radio station on Sirius Satellite Radio channel 110 produced by Martha Stewart Living Omnimedia. The station aired a variety of programming hosted by the company's team of experts, covering topics related to the domestic arts, including day and date reruns of the company's flagship television program Martha. In addition, Martha Stewart Living Radio also aired a weekday-evening talk show co-hosted by Martha Stewart's daughter Alexis Stewart, Whatever with Alexis and Jennifer.

Following the Sirius / XM merger, Martha Stewart Living Radio was added to XM on 2008-09-30 as part of its "Best of Sirius" package and broadcasts on channel 157, but was moved to channel 110 on May 4, 2011.

Martha Stewart Living Radio ceased production and broadcasting on February 18, 2013. Martha Steward hosted a 2-hour show on Sirius XM Stars channel 107 Mon-Fri from noon-2pm, called "Martha Live", from 2013 to 2015. Archives of broadcasts from the former Martha Stewart Living Radio can be accessed online and via SiriusXM radio app for smartphones.

Personalities
 Jennifer Hutt
 Marc Morrone
 Christine Nagy
 Alexis Stewart
 Martha Stewart
 Andrew Weil

See also
Martha Stewart
Whatever with Alexis and Jennifer

References

External links
Martha Stewart Living Radio
Martha Stewart Living Radio (XM Page)

Sirius Satellite Radio channels
XM Satellite Radio channels
Digital-only radio stations
News and talk radio stations in the United States
Radio stations established in 2006
Radio stations disestablished in 2013
Martha Stewart Living Omnimedia
Defunct radio stations in the United States